In mathematics, a first-order partial differential equation is a partial differential equation that involves only first derivatives of the unknown function of n variables. The equation takes the form

Such equations arise in the construction of characteristic surfaces for hyperbolic partial differential equations, in the calculus of variations, in some geometrical problems, and in simple models for gas dynamics whose solution involves the method of characteristics. If a family of solutions
of a single first-order partial differential equation can be found, then additional solutions may be obtained by forming envelopes of solutions in that family. In a related procedure, general solutions may be obtained by integrating families of ordinary differential equations.

General solution and complete integral

The general solution to the first order partial differential equation is a solution which contains an arbitrary function. But, the solution to the first order partial differential equations with as many arbitrary constants as the number of independent variables is called the complete integral. The following n-parameter family of solutions

is a complete integral if . The below discussions on the type of integrals are based on the textbook A Treatise on Differential Equations (Chaper IX, 6th edition, 1928) by Andrew Forsyth.

Complete integral
The solutions are described in relatively simple manner in two or three dimensions with which the key concepts are trivially extended to higher dimensions. A general first-order partial differential equation in three dimensions has the form

where  Suppose  be the complete integral that contains three arbitrary constants . From this we can obtain three relations by differentiation 

  
 
 

Along with the complete integral , the above three relations can be used to eliminate three constants and obtain an equation (original partial differential equation) relating .

General integral
Once a complete integral is found, a general solution can be constructed from it. The general integral is obtained by making the constants functions of the coordinates, i.e., . Differentiation of the complete integral now provides

  
 
 

This requirement can be written more compactly by writing it as

 

where

is the Jacobian determinant. The condition  leads to the general solution. Whenever , then there exists a functional relation between  because whenever a determinant is zero, the columns (or rows) are not linearly independent. Take this functional relation to be 

 

Once  is found, the problem is solved. From the above relation, we have . By summing the original equations ,  and  we find . Now eliminating  from the two equations derived, we obtain

 

 
 

Note that we have assumed  to make the determinant  zero, but this is not always needed. The relations  or,  suffice to make the determinant zero.

Singular integral
Singular integral is obtained when .

 

The three equations can be used to solve the three unknowns . Solution obtained by elimination of  this way leads to what are called singular integrals.

Special integral
Usually, most integrals fall into three categories defined above, but it may happen that a solution does not fit into any of three types of integrals mentioned above. These solutions are called special integrals. A relation  that satisfies the partial differential equation is said to a special integral if we are unable to determine  from the following equations

 
 
 

If we able to determine  from the above set of equations, then  will turn out to be one of the three integrals described before.

Two dimensional case
The general integral is obtained by eliminating  from the following equations

 

The singular integral if it exists can be obtained by eliminating  from the following equations

 

If a complete integral is not available, solutions may still be obtained by solving a system of ordinary equations. To obtain this system, first note that the PDE determines a cone (analogous to the light cone) at each point: if the PDE is linear in the derivatives of u (it is quasi-linear), then the cone degenerates into a line. In the general case, the pairs (p,q) that satisfy the equation determine a family of planes at a given point:

where

The envelope of these planes is a cone, or a line if the PDE is quasi-linear. The condition for an envelope is

Hence the generator of the cone is a line with direction

This direction corresponds to the light rays for the wave equation.
To integrate differential equations along these directions, we require increments for p and q along the ray. This can be obtained by differentiating the PDE:
 

Therefore the ray direction in  space is

The integration of these equations leads to a ray conoid at each point . General solutions of the PDE can then be obtained from envelopes of such conoids.

Definitions of linear dependence for differential systems

An equivalent description is given. Two definitions of linear dependence are given for first-order linear partial differential equations.

Where  are independent variables;  are dependent unknowns; 
Let  .

Definition I:  Given a number field , 
when there are coefficients, not all zero, 
such that ; the Eqs.(*) are linear dependent.

Definition II (differential linear dependence):   
Given a number field , when there are coefficients, 
not all zero, such that ,
the Eqs.(*) are thought as differential linear dependent. 
If , this definition degenerates into the definition I.

The div-curl systems, Maxwell's equations, Einstein's equations (with four harmonic coordinates) and 
Yang-Mills equations (with gauge conditions) are well-determined in definition II, whereas are over-determined in definition I.

Characteristic surfaces for the wave equation

Characteristic surfaces for the wave equation are level surfaces for solutions of the equation

There is little loss of generality if we set : in that case u satisfies

In vector notation, let

A family of solutions with planes as level surfaces is given by 

where

If x and x0 are held fixed, the envelope of these solutions is obtained by finding a point on the sphere of radius 1/c where the value of u is stationary. Hence the envelope has equation

These solutions correspond to spheres whose radius grows or shrinks with velocity c. These are light cones in space-time.

The initial value problem for this equation consists in specifying a level surface S where u=0 for t=0.  The solution is obtained by taking the envelope of all the spheres with centers on S, whose radii grow with velocity c. This envelope is obtained by requiring that

This condition will be satisfied if  is normal to S. Thus the envelope corresponds to motion with velocity c along each normal to S. This is the Huygens' construction of wave fronts: each point on S emits a spherical wave at time t=0, and the wave front at a later time t is the envelope of these spherical waves. The normals to S are the light rays.

References

Further reading 

Partial differential equations